Baykibashevo (Bayqıbaş) is a rural locality (a selo) and the administrative centre of Baykibashevsky Selsoviet, Karaidelsky District, Bashkortostan, Russia. The population was 1,133 as of 2010. There are 16 streets.

Geography 
Baykibashevo is located 25 km west of Karaidel (the district's administrative centre) by road. Bazilevsky is the nearest rural locality.

References 

Rural localities in Karaidelsky District